Nonhlanhla Mildred Khoza is a South African politician in KwaZulu-Natal serving as the Member of the Executive Council (MEC) for the provincial Department of Social Development. She was appointed to the position in May 2019. Khoza became a member of the KwaZulu-Natal Legislature in May 2014. She is the current provincial chairperson of the African National Congress Women's League.

Political career
Khoza is a member of the African National Congress and the provincial chairperson of the party's women's league. In 2017, Khoza campaigned for Nkosazana Dlamini-Zuma to become ANC national president. She is also a supporter of the party's provincial chairperson Sihle Zikalala.

Khoza became a member of the KwaZulu-Natal Legislature on 21 May 2014 following the 2014 provincial election. After the 2019 provincial election, Zikalala was elected premier. On 27 May 2019, he appointed Khoza as the Member of the Executive Council responsible for the provincial Department of Social Development, succeeding Weziwe Thusi. She was sworn in on the same day.

On 11 August 2022, Khoza was reappointed as Social Development MEC by the newly elected premier Nomusa Dube-Ncube.

References

External links
Department Of Social Development Province of KwaZulu-Natal-MEC Profile

Living people
Year of birth missing (living people)
Zulu people
African National Congress politicians
Members of the KwaZulu-Natal Legislature
21st-century South African politicians